Nadia (Sarah-Beila) Ihorivna Lipes (born 24 December 1976, Balakliia, USSR) is a Ukrainian writer, historian, licensed tour guide, public figure. One of the leading genealogists in the post-Soviet states.

Biography 
Born into a Jewish family. in 1997 she immigrated to Israel. She studied at the International Solomon University, where she studied judaic and sociology. In 2004 she returned to Kyiv and worked as a realtor before the financial crisis. In 2008 she founded courses for Jewish guides in Ukraine, since 2009 she has been organizing tourism and working with archival documents, searching and restoring genealogical data. She gives lectures in Ukraine and in many other countries of the world, in particular in the US, Israel, Germany. She knows Hebrew, Russian, Ukrainian, Spanish and English.

Activities 
Since 2007 she has been engaged in the protection and documentation of old Jewish cemeteries, the author of numerous photographs of Jewish headstones of historical, cultural and artistic value. Author of numerous studies of archival documents.
Founder and author of a memorial site with a list of victims of pogroms, which she finances at her own expense.
Restored or supplemented the Family tree of Dustin Hoffman, Isaac Babel, Leonid Utyosov, Vladimir Vysotsky, Mishka Yaponchik, David Hofstein, Menachem-Mendel Schneerson and other famous personalities. She indexed more than a million archival records from the times of the Russian Empire related to Jewish genealogy from the archives of Ukraine — and posted them online. 
  
In September 2017, she participated in the international program conference «Riga Forum – Holocaust and Contemporary Radicalism» in Riga with more than 100 participants from 17 countries. In July–August 2019, she spoke at the International Conference on Jewish Genealogy in Cleveland. In the summer of 2020, she participated in the opening of a memorial monument to those who died in Tetiiv.

Personal life 
Her son Nikita has served in Israel Defense Forces, doing military service in the Golani Brigade.

Publications 
 Липес Н. И. А вы по национальности? Astroprint, 2017. .
 Липес Н. И. Советские документы. Что, где, зачем. Astroprint, 2018. .
 Липес Н. И. Досоветские документы. Что, где, зачем, 1786—1917. Astroprint, 2019. .
 Липес Н. И. Погромы: неудобная правда, 1917-1921. Астропринт, 2021. ISBN 978-966-927-806-7.
 Липес Н. И. «Грабармия» Деникина в записках врача Лазаря Билинкиса. Лехаим № 11 (355), 28 октября 2021.
 Lipes N. I. Kiev Archives: Documentation of World War I Jewish Refugees. Avotaynu Volume XXX, Number 2, Summer 2014.
 Lipes N. I. Russian Empire Army Census of 1875 For the Territory of Ukraine. Avotaynu Volume XXX, Number 3, Fall 2014.
 Lipes N. I. Jewish Berdichev as Seen Through Two Archival Collections. Avotaynu Volume XXX, Number 4, Winter 2014.
 Lipes N. I. Archival Records from the Russian Courts, Police, Notaries and Other State Agencies. Avotaynu Volume XXXI, Number 1, Spring 2015.
 Lipes N. I. Y-DNA Helps Trace a Litvak's Roots Back to Eretz Yisrael Two Thousand Years Ago. Avotaynu Volume XXXI, Number 2, Summer 2015.
 Lipes N. I. Hidden Jewish History: The Expulsion of Jews from Kiev in 1827 and the Story of the Rabbis. Avotaynu Volume XXXI, Number 3, Fall 2015.
 Lipes N. I. Archival Records of Jewish Refugees to the USSR (1939—1940). Avotaynu Volume XXXI, Number 4, Winter 2015.
 Lipes N. I. Hard-to-Find Family History: A Story About Some «Illegitimate» Jewish Children. Avotaynu Volume XXXII, Number 1, Spring 2016.
 Lipes N. I. What May be Learned from the Personal Files of Jewish Students in the Russian Empire. Avotaynu Volume XXXII, Number 2, Summer 2016.
 Lipes N. I. Your Connection to Rabbi Levi Yitzhak from Berdichev. Avotaynu Volume XXXII, Number 4, Winter 2016.
 Lipes N. I. Developing an Index of Jewish Records for Old Kiev Guberniya. Avotaynu Volume XXXIII, Number 2, Summer 2017.
 Lipes N. I. A Journey to One’s Roots. Avotaynu Volume XXXIII, Number 4, Winter 2017.

References

External links 
 Is Your Genealogist Certified or Certifiable?
 Publications on the «Lechaim» website
 Alex and Nadia Lipes: «A person needs roots to feel confident in this world»
 Nadia Lipes: «I have a mission»
 Nadia Lipes: «Relatives, as well as ancestors, are different»
 Sarah Nadia Lipes: «Making the World Remember»
 Spanish Jews: flight canceled
 Personal blog

People from Kharkiv Oblast
1976 births
Living people
Genealogists
Ukrainian women historians
21st-century Ukrainian women writers
20th-century Ukrainian Jews
Ukrainian emigrants to Israel
Israeli people of Ukrainian-Jewish descent